Cardoso en Gulevandia is the eighth album of Les Luthiers, released in October, 1991. The recording, like previous disks of the group, took place in the Ion studies in the city of Buenos Aires, in the month of October 1991. The name of the album is due to the homonymous work of the group.
The soloist singers are
Gabriel Renaud (Tenor) Cardoso,
Lia Ferenese (Soprano) Creolina, 
Victor Torres (Baritone) Creolina's father

Track listing

Side one
 "Iniciación a las Artes Marciales (Música Lejanamente Oriental)"
 "Sólo Necesitamos (Canción Ecológica)"
 "Una Canción Regia (Canon Escandaloso)"
 "Añoralgias (Zamba Catástrofe)"
 "Romance del Joven Conde, la Sirena y el Pájaro Cucú. Y la Oveja (Zoo-Cuento Infantil)"

Side two
 "Cardoso en Gulevandia (Opera Bilingüe)"

Les Luthiers albums
1991 albums
1990s comedy albums